Jhaveri is an Indian surname, common among Sindhis and Gujarati banias. The word "Jhaveri" (also spelled Zaveri or Javeri) means jeweler, and is derived from the Arabic Javahari. Though not all people with surname Jhaveri are jewellers by profession, the surname indicates that their ancestors must have been jewelers.

People with surname Jhaveri:
 Shantidas Jhaveri (c. 1580s–1659), influential Indian jeweler and merchant during the Mughal era
 Umar Hajee Ahmed Jhaveri, Indian-South African businessman
 Krishnalal Jhaveri (1868–1957), India writer and judge
 Darshana Jhaveri (b. 1940), Indian Manipuri dancer
 Dileep Jhaveri (b. 1943), Gujarati poet from India
 Rakesh Jhaveri (b. 1966), Jain spiritual leader from India
 Anjala Zaveri, Indian-British actress
 Mansukhlal Jhaveri (1907–1981), Gujarati poet and critic

See also 
 Jhaveri Bazaar, the jewelers market in Mumbai, India

References 

Indian surnames
Gujarati people